Nikolai Isaakovich Pastukhov (13 May 1923 – 23 May 2014) was a Soviet and Russian actor.

Biography
Born on 13 May 1923 in the village  Peski (now —  Bryansk Oblast). At the age of 16 enrolled in drama school Bauman Palace of Pioneers to the teacher Sergey Vladimirovich Sierpinski. In 1941 he entered the Theater School Shchepkin. Since 1945, he worked in TSTKA in Tambov Drama Theatre, the theater  Contemporary, since 1958 — in DATS (now —  TSATRA).

In the Central House of the Red Army first came before the Great Patriotic War. Drafted into the Red Army on 7 October 1942, RVC Bauman Moscow. On the fronts with 25 September 1943. Was slightly injured. Musician musical platoon 308 LSKD Guard junior sergeant. In 1945 he returned to TSTKA. In 1953–1957 years —  actor Tambov Drama Theater named Lunacharsky, in 1957-1958 —  Theater  Contemporary,  in the years 1945-1953 and 1958 — Russian Army Theatre.

Death
Died in Moscow on 23 May 2014. His funeral was held on 26 May. He was buried at Troyekurovskoye Cemetery.

Selected filmography 

Uncle Vanya (1971) as Iliya Ilich Telyegin
 The Stationmaster (1972) as Samson Vyrin
 Investigation Held by ZnaToKi (1973) as Gusev
At Home Among Strangers (1974) as Stepan Lipyagin, Chekist
From Dawn Till Sunset (1975) as  Fyodor Vasilevich Roznov
A Slave of Love (1976) as Veniamin Konstantinovich, writer
An Unfinished Piece for Mechanical Piano (1977) as Porfiry Semyonovich Glagolyev
The Feast Day (1978) as Grinin
On the Eve of the Premiere (1978) as Ivan Maksimovich
Wedding Day Will Have to be Clarified (1979) as Pyotr Andreyevich Shitov
A Few Days from the Life of I.I. Oblomov (1980) as Stoltz's father
Three Years (1980)  as Dr. Belavin
 Such a Strange Evening in a Narrow Family Circle (1985) as Edda Pavelko
Viktoria (1987) as Oscar Borisovich
Khristiane (1987) as priest
Presumption of innocence (1988) as Pyotr Nikitich
Lady Macbeth of the Mtsensk District (1989) as Zinovy Borisovich
Crash – Cop's Daughter (1989) as Valeria's grandfather
Po 206 (1990) as Aleksey Semyonovich
The Russia House (1990) as uncle Matvey
Lost in Siberia (1991) as uncle Misha
Pustynya (1991) as John the Baptist
Police Academy: Mission to Moscow (1994) as head of the family
Mute Witness (1995) as janitor
Un tramway à Moscou (1996) as Boris Ivanovich
Prazdnik (2001) as Semyon Ivanovich
You Will Not Leave Me (2006) as old man (final film role)

References

External links
  
  Nikolai Pastukhov at the kino-teatr.ru 

1923 births
2014 deaths
People from Surazh
Russian male film actors
Russian male stage actors
Soviet male film actors
Soviet male stage actors
Honored Artists of the RSFSR
People's Artists of the RSFSR
20th-century Russian male actors
21st-century Russian male actors
Recipients of the Order of Honour (Russia)
Burials in Troyekurovskoye Cemetery
Soviet military personnel of World War II